The Julcán Province is one of twelve provinces of the La Libertad Region in Peru. The capital of this province is the city of Julcán.

Political division
The province is divided into four districts, which are:

 Julcán
 Calamarca
 Carabamba
 Huaso

See also
La Libertad Region
Peru

Provinces of the La Libertad Region